A green design concept is to facilitate sustainable use of the resources – energy, water and other materials – all through the complete life cycle of the building including its construction.

Glass is a useful material that has such advantages such as Transparency, Natural Day-lighting, permitting a sky view and Acoustic control, depending on the glazing solution used. Glass is a wholly recyclable material.
Glass is beloved by architects as well as designers.

Glass can play a role in accomplishing greater indoor environmental quality and when used carefully can improve energy efficiency, however a measured approach needs to be taken to ensure the building loads are not excessively increased due to solar gain.

The intent of a green building design is to curtail the demand on non-renewable resources, amplify utilization efficiency of these resources when in use, and augment the reuse, recycling, and consumption of renewable resources.

Double glazed glass
Architects use high-performance double-glazed glass, which is laminated or coated, to moderate interior temperatures by controlling heat loss and gain. The coating filters the heat-producing aspects of solar rays. The use of such glass in green buildings is used comprehensively in tropical climates as well as the Middle East.

Solar control glass

Solar control glass can be an eye-catching characteristic of a building whilst at the same time diminishing, or even eradicating the need for an air-conditioning system, reducing running costs of the building and saving energy. Solar control glass can be particular for any situation where unwarranted solar heat gain is likely to be a bother. E.g. Large façades, glass walkways, atria and conservatories.

References

External links
Guidelines for use of Glass in Green Buildings
Glass in Buildings
Glassisgreen
Glass in Architecture
Glass in Building
Glass and Building Regulations
Australia standards for Glass in Buildings
CODE OF PRACTICE FOR USE OF GLASS IN BUILDINGS
Deutsches - Glass in building

Glass architecture
Sustainable building